The Santa Maria-Bonita School District in Santa Maria, California, has four junior high schools and seventeen elementary schools with approximately about 17,500 students enrolled.

Elementary schools

Juan Pacifico Ontiveros Elementary School
Ida Redmond Taylor Elementary School
Bonita Elementary School
George Washington Battles Elementary School
Don Juan Bautista Arellanes Elementary School
Martin Luther Tunnell Elementary School
Isaac Miller Elementary School
Liberty Elementary School
Robert Bruce Elementary School
William Hickman Rice Elementary School
Fairlawn Elementary School
David Sanchez Sr. Elementary School
William Laird Adam Elementary School
Alvin Avenue Elementary School
Cary Calvin Oakley Elementary School
Roberto & Dr. Francisco Jimenez Elementary School
Bill Libbon Elementary School

Junior high schools

Isaac Fesler Junior High School
Tommie Kunst Junior High School
El Camino Junior High School
Don Juan Bautista Arellanes Junior High School

References

External links
 

School districts in Santa Barbara County, California
Santa Maria, California